Oliver Twist is a 1962 BBC TV adaptation of Charles Dickens' 1838 novel Oliver Twist, serialised in 13 episodes. Due in part to its transmission at Sunday teatimes, the production proved to be controversial, with questions asked in Parliament and many viewer complaints over the brutal murder of Nancy by Bill Sikes in its eleventh episode. The serial has survived intact, and was released to DVD in 2017 by Simply Media.

Plot
For a detailed plot, see Oliver Twist.

Cast

Archive status
All episodes survived the BBC's junking intact. Although the original 405-line master videotapes were wiped or destroyed, copies survived in the form of telerecordings created for preservation and/or rebroadcast. The films received restoration by Peter Crocker at SVS (known for classic Doctor Who restoration for DVD releases), although some faults such as high pitched ringing over the audio and a lack of VidFIRE due to the low quality of the reels are evident on the release, which is displayed as a warning on the DVD.

Critical reception
Of its DVD release, Archive Television Musings wrote “Whilst there’s numerous adaptations of Olivier Twist to choose from, this one – thanks to the fidelity it displays to Dickens’ original novel and the performances (especially Peter Vaughan's rampaging Bill Sikes) – is certainly worth checking out.  Recommended. “

References

External links
 

BBC television dramas
Television series set in the 19th century
1962 British television series debuts
1962 British television series endings
1960s British drama television series
Television shows based on Oliver Twist
Television series about orphans